Forever is an album by Cracker. The band performed "Shine" on the Late Show with David Letterman and "Merry Christmas Emily" on The Late Late Show.

Track listing
All songs written by David Lowery and John Hickman, except where noted. 
"Brides of Neptune" (Lowery) - 4:57
"Shine" - 4:20
"Don't Bring Us Down" - 4:02
"Guarded by Monkeys" (Lowery) - 4:22 
"Ain't That Strange"  - 4:07  
"Miss Santa Cruz County"  - 4:29
"Superfan"  (Hickman) - 3:56
"Sweet Magdalena of My Misfortune" (Lowery) -3:35
"Merry Christmas Emily"  - 3:56
"Forever" - 4:13 
"Shameless" - 3:44
"One Fine Day" - 6:54 
"What You're Missing" (Lowery, Hickman, Kenny Margolis, Frank Funaro, Paul Rexrode, Brandy Wood) - 5:42

Musicians

Cracker:
 David Lowery – vocals, guitar, keyboards, Vox organ, bass
 Johnny Hickman – guitar, vocals, Vox organ, percussion
 Brandy Wood – bass, vocals, Vox organ
 Frank Funaro – drums, percussion, vocals, Vox organ
 Kenny Margolis - keyboards, accordion, vocals, Vox organ

References

2002 albums
Cracker (band) albums
Virgin Records albums
Albums produced by David Lowery (musician)